Mostje is a settlement north of Lendava in the Prekmurje region of Slovenia, on the border with Hungary.

References

External links
Mostje on Geopedia

Populated places in the Municipality of Lendava